Waco is an unincorporated community located in Madison County, Kentucky, United States. The community is part of the Richmond–Berea Micropolitan Statistical Area. It is located at the junction of Kentucky Route 52 and Kentucky Route 977.

History
A post office called Waco has been in operation since 1861. The community was probably named after Waco, Texas.
Serial killer Glen Edward Rogers was arrested in Waco after a high speed chase on November 13, 1995

References

Unincorporated communities in Madison County, Kentucky
Unincorporated communities in Kentucky